Kalajoki Airfield  is an airfield in Kalajoki, Finland, about  west-southwest of Kalajoki town centre.

See also
List of airports in Finland

References

External links
 VFR Suomi/Finland – Kalajoki Airfield
 Lentopaikat.net – Kalajoki Airfield 

Airports in Finland
Airfield
Buildings and structures in North Ostrobothnia